Marvin Tandy Culpepper, Sr. (November 26, 1908 – January 31, 1970), was an engineer, machinist, and farmer from Jackson Parish in North Louisiana, who served from 1964 to 1968 as a Democrat in the Louisiana House of Representatives. His one term in office coincided with the first term of Governor John McKeithen. He was defeated for reelection by his fellow Democrat E. L. "Bubba" Henry, who in his second term in the chamber became the House Speaker.

References

 

1908 births
1970 deaths
Democratic Party members of the Louisiana House of Representatives
People from Jonesboro, Louisiana
20th-century American engineers
Farmers from Louisiana
United States Army personnel of World War II
United States Army soldiers
20th-century American businesspeople
20th-century American politicians